Amphisbaena maranhensis is a species of worm lizard found in Brazil.

References

lumbricalis
Reptiles described in 2012
Taxa named by Jerriane O. Gomes
Taxa named by Adriano O. Maciel
Endemic fauna of Brazil
Reptiles of Brazil